Kidambi (கிடாம்பி) is an Indian surname. The other variants are Cadambi, Cidambi or Kadambi. The most common of the variants is Kidambi – this is the closest to Kilambi, the Tamil word. People holding this surname are Brahmins belonging to ‘Atreya Gotra’ and the Apastamba sutra, Taittiriya Shakha of the Krishna Yajurveda.

Etymology
The modern common variant ‘Kidambi’ should have come from Keezh-Ambi (or Kilambi), a village that exists to this day between Kooram and Thiruputkuzhi in present-day Kanchipuram district. This village, adjacent to the Musaravakkam village, is populated by Brahmins belonging to the Atreya Gotra and Apastamba Sutra. This village is proximate to the divya desam of Thiruputkuzhi. Considering the Kidambis were a migrant group among brahmins, the name 'Kilambi' could have morphed itself into its modern variant ‘Kidambi’ with the passage of time.

Another version of history attributes Kidambis to a group of Brahmins who performed services of carrying water from the Vegavathi River to the Tiruvekkaa temple regularly. This group earned the titled Ghatambi (Ghatam + Ambi), i.e. water suppliers. Ghatambi, eventually, due to linguistic evolution, could have morphed into Kidambi, and when descendants of this family started migrating, Kidambi became Kadambi/Cadambi in Karnataka due to influence of Kannada, which refers to the pitcher as ‘koda’ or ‘cada’, and hence the ‘Ghatambis’ came to be called the Kadambis/Cadambis. In the Andhra Region, they could have come to be called as Kidambis. However, considering that 'Kadambi' is a derived name and not the original, this version does not appear all that plausible.

While it seems reasonable to assume that people with this surname are generally Srivaishnavas, it can be quite a misleading assumption. The distinguished historian and archaeologist, C. Minakshi, who belonged to a Smartha family, carried this family name, spelt as Cadambi.

Kidambis in Srivaishnavism
While the Srivaishnava traditional history and commentaries reveal several preceptors with the surname ‘Kidambi’, and the earliest among them being Kidambi Aacchan, very little is known about the background and history of this lineage of Brahmins. Of the little we know about them, it appears that the Kidambis hailed from a place near Kanchipuram, are closely associated with the people of Kooram, and have been, at some point of time, associated with the divya desam of Thirupputkuzhi.  A major section of the Kidambis today represent the Thenkalai sect of Srivaishnavism. A smaller group of people associated with the Vadakalai sect are either swayamacharya purushas or are closely associated with Ahobila Mutt among other institutions

Kidambi Aachaan, one of the eminent descendants of the Kidambi lineage, lived between 1057 and 1157 A.D. and is said to have hailed from this place. He was an ardent disciple of Ramanuja and a great scholar in Vishishtadvaita Vedanta. Ramanuja honoured his scholarship by conferring on him the title of Vedantodayana. He is believed to have lived 20 more years after the ascent of Ramanuja to the divine abode Vaikuntha.

Vedanta Desika, a follower of Ramanuja's tradition, refers to Kidambi Aachaan in Chapter 32 of his work 'Srimad Rahasya Traya Saram'. His son, Kumara Varadachar refers to him in his Adhikarana Chinthamani, a commentary on his father's Adhikarana Saravali (verse 24). Kidambi Aacchan is the nephew of the wife of Thirumalai Nambi. He was at Thirumalai at his brother-in-law's house, when Pillan was born to the Tirumalai Nambi couple. After Pillan's Upanayana, Thirumalai Nambi entrusted his son to Kidambi Aacchan and asked him to become a disciple of Ramanuja. Ramanuja took Kidambi Aacchan as his disciple and instructed him on the scriptures. Kidambi Aachaan took great interest in serving the feet of his preceptor.

There was a time when jealous temple workers at Srirangam tried to poison Ramanuja. The attempt failed due to the divine intervention of Lord Ranganatha. Periya Nambi and Tirukkottiyur Nambi were alarmed when they heard about this incident and rushed to Srirangam. On hearing that his preceptors were on their way to meet him, Ramanuja rushed to meet His Gurus and as they crossed the sands of Cauvery river, Ramanuja fell at their feet in the mid-day heat and continued offering his prostrations. Kidambi Aacchan was standing next to the prostrating Ramanuja and could not stand the suffering undergone by his preceptor. He criticized Periya Nambi and Tirukkoshtiyur Nambi for allowing Ramanuja to offer repeated prostrations in the scalding heat and embraced Ramanuja in a bid to protect him. Noticing this behaviour of Aacchan, Tirukkoshtiyur Nambi said then to Aacchan: "My dear Kidambi Aacchan! we waited on Ramanuja a little longer to find out if there is anyone, who is dear to him. Now we have found out that you are the one. We entrust you with the responsibility to protect Ramanuja from any further danger.” Kidambi Aacchan accepted the command of his pracharyas and continued to perform cooking service (Madappalli Kaimkaryam) to Ramanuja since then. The followers in the lineage of Kidambi Aacchan are thus known to belong to the "Madapalli Vazhi Vantha Sampradhayam."

Migration of Kidambis
Around the 13th-14th century, a group of Srivaishnavas, hailing from the villages of Kooram and Kidambi near Kanchipuram, embarked on a trip to Thiruppullani to worship Lord Jagannatha and have a holy dip in the Setu ocean. On their return journey, they were asked to settle down in a village called Karappankadu near Mannargudi by Divine Command. These settlers duly consecrated a temple for Lord Varadaraja with His idol recovered from a termite mound near Vaduvur. With the passage of time, some of these people migrated to nearby villages, forming the ‘Pancha Gramams’ or ‘Five Villages’ around Mannargudi that we see today – Karappankadu, Serankulam, Nammankurichi, Peravurani and Puliyakkudi/Selperi. Some of these Srivaishnavas also appear to have settled down in Srirangam and in the temple towns adjoining Trichy.

Some of the Kidambi Srivaishnavas from Srivilliputhur migrated to Nuzvid asthanam during 19th century and before independence their heirs spread across Antarvedi Palem, Narasapuram, Nellore, Allur, Nellore district and few other places in Andhra Pradesh to worship various forms of Lord Vishnu & Ramanuja in different temples.

Notable people

 Sundararajan Kidambi, an International Grandmaster of Chess from Tamilnadu ,India.
 Srikanth Kidambi, an Indian badminton player
 Cadambi Sheshachar Venkatachar (1899-1999)  was an Indian Civil Servant and the Chief Minister of Rajasthan.
 Kadambi Rangachari (1868-1934) was an Indian ethnologist who served as Assistant Superintendent of the Madras museum.
 Kilambi Ramanujachari, Principal of Maharajah's College, Vizianagaram
 Kilambi Venkata Narasimhacharyulu (1921-1989)  was a playwright, lyrics and story writer of the Telugu films.
 Kidambi Sampath Kumaracharya (born in 1946), an ardent devotee & Upasakha of Lord Hanuman. Founder of Sri Maruthi Ashramam temple in the year 1975 at Allur, Nellore district Andhra Pradesh
  Geetha Kadambee
 Chetan (actor), Indian actor

References

Indian surnames